Moncton—Riverview—Dieppe (formerly known as Moncton) is a federal electoral district in New Brunswick, Canada, that has been represented in the House of Commons of Canada since 1968.

Political geography
The riding of Moncton was created in 1966 when the district of Westmorland was split. The other riding is now called Beauséjour. The riding's initial area consisted of the city of Moncton and town of Dieppe, two parishes in Westmorland County (Moncton and Salisbury), and the Parish of Coverdale in Albert County.

As the Moncton area grew in population the riding shrank. The area of Albert County outside the town of Riverview was removed in 1976, a large area north of Moncton was removed in 1987, and the Petitcodiac and Salisbury areas were removed in 1997, to the point where the riding no longer has any largely rural areas. In 1998, Riverview and Dieppe were added to the riding's name. In 2003, the more suburban areas of Riverview and the southern part of Dieppe were removed.  Finally, in 2014, the remaining suburban areas of Dieppe were given to Beauséjour.

The riding includes the entire city of Moncton and most of the town of Riverview and the city of Dieppe excluding the north east section, i.e., Melanson Road and up to the city limits.

The neighbouring ridings are Beauséjour and Fundy Royal.

As per the 2012 federal electoral redistribution, this riding will lose 8% of its territory to Beauséjour.

Demographics

According to the Canada 2011 Census; 2013 representation

Ethnic groups: 93.4% White, 2.0% Aboriginal, 1.6% Black 
Languages: 63.6% English, 34.9% French
Religions: 78.3% Christian (47.8% Catholic, 8.9% Baptist, 7.9% United Church, 4.9% Anglican, 8.8% Other), 19.7% No religion 
Median income (2010): $28,162 
Average income (2010): $35,584

History
Moncton has elected some well-known and controversial Members of Parliament. Former mayor Leonard Jones, who took a tough stance against French language education, won the Progressive Conservative Party nomination for the 1974 election, but party leader Robert Stanfield refused to sign his nomination papers because of Jones' opposition to party policy on Official bilingualism. Jones ran and won as an independent candidate.

Dennis Cochrane, later the leader of the New Brunswick PC Party, represented the city for one term in the 1980s, and Conservative, Robert Goguen, is the riding's current representative in the House of Commons.

Members of Parliament

This riding has elected the following members of the House of Commons of Canada:

Election results

Moncton—Riverview—Dieppe 

This riding lost territory to Beauséjour for the 42nd Canadian federal election.

Moncton

See also
 List of Canadian federal electoral districts
 Past Canadian electoral districts
 Greater Moncton

References

Notes

External links
Riding history from the Library of Parliament:
Moncton 1966-1998
Moncton—Riverview—Dieppe 1998-present

New Brunswick federal electoral districts
Riverview, New Brunswick
Politics of Moncton
Politics of Dieppe, New Brunswick